Usfahrt Oerlike is a 2015 Swiss German-language film. It was filmed and produced at locations in Zürich in Switzerland, and is the second last film starring Mathias Gnädinger, and Jörg Schneider's last movie film.

Cast 
 Jörg Schneider as Hans Hilfiker
 Mathias Gnädinger as Willi Keller
 Beatrice Blackwell as Mary 
 Daniel Rohr as Beat Hilfiker 
 Heidi Maria Glössner as Emilie Brütsch 
 Leo Thomas as Sam 
 Katharina von Bock as Direktorin Rossmöller 
 Stefano Wenk as Oliver 
 Klaus-Henner Russius as Dr. Claus Vogel 
 Monica Gubser as Annemarie 
 Vincenzo Biagi as Dieter 
 Sabine Timoteo as Ronja 
 Lotti Happle as Nicole 
 Aaron Hitz as Thomas 
 Martin Villiger as Chorleiter

Plot (excerpt) 
Hans (Jörg Schneider) assumes that he has had a good life: He has seen the world and loved his wife Martheli, who died two years earlier. He can barely cope with everyday life and Hans is tired, he wants to die. His best friend Willi (Mathias Gnädinger) will help him to carry out his plan.

An unfortunate accident forces Hans to enter the local retirement home for a few weeks. However, neither the nurse Mary (Beatrice Blackwell) nor the conversations with Mrs. Brütsch (Heidi Maria Glössner) motivate Hans to enjoy his life in the nursing home. But when his son suddenly enters his life again, Hans seems to hesitate ending his life by suicide...

Title 
The title of the film derives from the Swiss German term meaning Exit Oerlikon; usfahrt may also refer to "end" (of life).

Reception

Production 

For the plot, the play EXIT by Thomas Hostettler was adapted. The film was shot and produced in Zürich-Oerlikon and at locations in Switzerland. According to Paul Riniker, a sequel was planned but will not be realized as Mathias Gnädinger died on 3 April 2015, and Jörg Schneider on 22 August 2015 at the age of 80 – Schneider was not aware that he was suffering from liver cancer during the film shooting in May 2014.

Premiered at the Solothurn Film Festival on 23 January 2015, Usfahrt Oerlike was aired in Swiss German cinemas starting on 29 January 2015, and on SRF 1 it was shown for the first time on 11 September 2016.

Festivals 
 2015 Schaffhausen Filmfestival
 2015 Solothurner Filmtage

Awards 
 2015 Solothurn Film Festival: Won Publikumspreis (Prix du public).

References

External links 
 

2015 films
Swiss drama films
Swiss German-language films
2015 drama films
Films shot in Zürich
Films about suicide
2010s German-language films